You is the second single from the reedition of the 2008 Schiller platinum album Sehnsucht featuring vocals by Colbie Caillat. The song was officially released in October 2008 and was peaking at number 19 on German singles chart in 2008.

Track listing
"You"
"Zeit der Sehnsucht"

Background

The Song was written in July 2008 in the USA by Christopher von Deylen (Schiller) and Colbie Caillat.

Music video

The music video for "You" was shot on August 25, 2008 in Los Angeles at the shore of the Pacific Ocean by German director Marcus Sternberg. It made its world premiere on October 3, 2008 on the German music TV station VIVA.

The video features Christopher von Deylen, Colbie Caillat and others. In the video, Caillat is shown in front of a car and ram-air inflatable single-line kites in the shape of octopuses and under and on a pier.

Charts

References

External links
 Official music video of You
 The music video of You

2008 singles
Colbie Caillat songs
Schiller (band) songs
Songs written by Colbie Caillat
2008 songs
Songs written by Christopher von Deylen